The 2005 season was the 93rd year of competitive soccer in the United States.

National team

The home team or the team that is designated as the home team is listed in the left column; the away team is in the right column.

Major League Soccer

Standings

Playoffs

MLS Cup

USL First Division

Standings

Playoffs

Final

USL Second Division

Standings
Purple indicates regular season champion 
Green indicates playoff berth clinched

Playoffs
Semifinals 2-game aggregate

Final

Lamar Hunt U.S. Open Cup

Bracket
Home teams listed on top of bracket

Final

American clubs in international competitions

D.C. United

Kansas City Wizards

References
 American competitions at RSSSF
 American national team matches at RSSSF

 
2005